Navin Eranjan Dissanayake (born 9 September 1969) is a Sri Lankan politician, and former Minister of Plantation Industries. A former Member of Parliament for United National Party Nuwara Eliya District, he is a son of Gamini Dissanayake a Presidential candidate and grandson of Andrew Dissanayake who served as an MP for the Nuwara Eliya electorate and a deputy minister in the   S. W. R. D. Bandaranaike's government. His brother, Mayantha Dissanayake is an MP for UNP from Kandy District. He was educated  at S. Thomas' Preparatory School and Royal College Colombo.

He is an Attorney-at-law in the Sri Lanka, and he holds a master's degree in Finance and Financial Law from University of London. Hon Navin Dissanayake graduated from the University of Sussex in Law and was called to the Bar in the United Kingdom as a Barrister at Law from the Middle temple.

Dissanayake is married to Dr. Lanka Jayasuriya, daughter of Karu Jayasuriya, who holds a position in the World Health Organization, Sri Lanka as a National Professional Officer and they have two daughters Samdhee and Mahita.

See also
List of political families in Sri Lanka

References

External links
Biographies of Member of Parliament
Right Royal rally of old Royalists in the Sri Lanka Parliament
 My first and last love" 

1969 births
Living people
Cabinet ministers of Sri Lanka
Sinhalese lawyers
Sri Lankan Buddhists
Alumni of Royal College, Colombo
Members of the 11th Parliament of Sri Lanka
Members of the 12th Parliament of Sri Lanka
Members of the 13th Parliament of Sri Lanka
Members of the 14th Parliament of Sri Lanka
Members of the 15th Parliament of Sri Lanka
Tourism ministers of Sri Lanka